John Peel (born 1954) is a British writer, best known for his TV series tie-in novels and novelisations. He has written under several pseudonyms, including "John Vincent" and "Nicholas Adams". He lives in Long Island, New York. While his wife is a US citizen, Peel continues to travel under a British passport.

Career
During the 1980s, Peel wrote a licensed spin-off novel based on the popular 1960s TV series The Avengers, titled Too Many Targets. He is also known for his various books based on Doctor Who, Star Trek and James Bond Jr. (written as "John Vincent").

Doctor Who books
A friend of the television writer Terry Nation, Peel wrote novelisations of several Doctor Who stories for Target Books featuring Nation's Daleks; he is reportedly one of the few writers to have been willing to do so, given the high percentage of the author's fee that Nation's agents demanded for the rights to use the Daleks. For similar reasons, Peel is one of the few novelists to have used the Daleks in full-length, original Doctor Who novels, examples of which include War of the Daleks (1997) and Legacy of the Daleks (1998), written for the BBC Books Eighth Doctor Adventures range. Neither novel was especially well received by fans of the series, in part due to Peel's re-writing of Dalek history as depicted in the TV series (in particular the destruction of Skaro in the 1988 serial Remembrance of the Daleks), to bring their story more into line with Nation's vision.

With the publication of Timewyrm: Genesys (1991), Peel became the first author to write a full-length Doctor Who novel, featuring the Doctor, not to be based on either a TV or radio script. He had been selected by editor Peter Darvill-Evans to launch the Virgin New Adventures range, to resume the story of the Doctor's travels from where the now-cancelled TV series had left off. He also wrote the Evolution (1994) for their sister range, Missing Adventures (featuring previous Doctors and companions), and also The Gallifrey Chronicles (1991, not to be confused with the Eighth Doctor Adventures book), a compendium of the history of the Doctor's planet, Gallifrey.

He also wrote the following Lethbridge-Stewart novels, published by Candy Jar Books:
The Grandfather Infestation by John Peel
The Laughing Gnome: On His Majesty's National Service by John Peel
Source: https://en.wikipedia.org/wiki/Brigadier_Lethbridge-Stewart

Select bibliography
 Maniac
 Poison
 Shattered
 Talons
 The Mystery Files of Shelby Woo: Hot Rock
 The Secret of Dragonhome
 The Secret World of Alex Mack: I Spy, Lost in Vegas
 The Young Astronauts: Ready for Blastoff! (as "Rick North")
 Freedom's Fire (as "J.P. Trent")

Are You Afraid of the Dark? series
 The Tale of the Sinister Statues
 The Tale of the Restless House
 The Tale of the Zero Hero
 The Tale of the Three Wishes

Carmen Sandiego series
All published by Western Publishing.

 Where in America is Carmen Sandiego?
 Where in America's Past is Carmen Sandiego?
 Where in Europe is Carmen Sandiego?
 Where in Space is Carmen Sandiego?
 Where in the World is Carmen Sandiego?
 Where in the USA is Carmen Sandiego?
 Where in the USA is Carmen Sandiego, Part II?
 Where in Time is Carmen Sandiego?
 Where in Time is Carmen Sandiego, Part II?

Diadem series
The first six books were originally published by Apple. After the cancellation of the series by Apple, they were re-printed by Llewellyn Publications between 2004 and 2005. Books seven through ten were published directly by Llewellyn.  Books eleven and twelve were only published in a one-volume edition, by Dragonhome Books, in 2012.

Also published in French by AdA Éditions, under the title Les mondes de la magie du Diadème.

 Book of Names (August 1997, Paperback , Re-print )
 Book of Signs (August 1997, Paperback , Re-print )
 Book of Magic (August 1997, Paperback , Re-print )
 Book of Thunder (Hardback , Re-print )
 Book of Earth (February 1998, Paperback , Re-print )
 Book of Nightmares (April 1998, Paperback , Re-print )
 Book of War (May 2005)
 Book of Oceans (September 2005)
 Book of Reality (February 2006)
 Book of Doom (June 2006)
 Book of Time & Book of Games (November 2012)

Doctor Who series
 The Chase
 The Daleks' Master Plan, Part I: Mission to the Unknown
 The Daleks' Master Plan, Part II: The Mutation of Time
 The Power of the Daleks
 The Evil of the Daleks
 War of the Daleks
 Legacy of the Daleks
 The Gallifrey Chronicles
 Evolution
 Timewyrm: Genesys

Dragonhome Series
The Secret of Dragonhome (1998)
The Slayers of Dragonhome
The Siege Of Dragonhome

Eerie, Indiana series
 Eerie, Indiana: Bureau of Lost
 Eerie, Indiana: Simon and Marshall's Excellent Adventure

James Bond, Jr. series
All published by Puffin Books in 1992 under the pen name "John Vincent".

 A View to a Thrill
 The Eiffel Target
 Sandblast
 Live And Let's Dance
 Sword of Death
 High Stakes

Shockers series
Published by Grosset & Dunlap.

 Shockers: Alien Prey
 Shockers: Blood Wolf
 Shockers: Dead End
 Shockers: Ghost Lake
 Shockers: Grave Doubts
 Shockers: Night Wings

Star Trek: The Next Generation series
 Here There Be Dragons (1993)
 The Death of Princes (1997)

Star Trek: Deep Space Nine, Young Adult series
 Prisoners of Peace (1994)
 Field Trip (1995)

Star Trek: Deep Space Nine series
 Objective: Bajor (May 1996)

Tombstones series
Published by Pocket Books in 1995.

 Dances With Werewolves
 The Last Drop

2099 series
 Doomsday (September 1999)
 Betrayal (November 1999)
 Traitor (January 2000)
 Revolution (March 2000)
 Meltdown (May 2000)
 Firestorm (July 2000)

Written as "Nicholas Adams"
All published by HarperCollins. "Nicholas Adams" is also the pen name for Debra Doyle and James D. Macdonald.
 I.O.U. (1991)
 Santa Claws (1991)
 Horrorscope (1992)

Comics
Peel has written Doctor Who comic strips for Doctor Who Monthly:

 Doctor Who (art by John Stokes):
 "Devil of the Deep" (Doctor Who Monthly #61)
 "The Fires Down Below" (Doctor Who Monthly #67)

References

External links
 John Peel at On Target
 

1954 births
Writers from Nottingham
People educated at Carlton le Willows Academy
20th-century British novelists
21st-century British novelists
British comics writers
British expatriates in the United States
British fantasy writers
British horror writers
British male novelists
British non-fiction writers
British science fiction writers
British spy fiction writers
English television critics
Living people
Military science fiction writers
People from Long Island
Writers from New York (state)
Writers of Doctor Who novels
Date of birth missing (living people)
Male non-fiction writers
20th-century pseudonymous writers
21st-century pseudonymous writers